Qatar Petroleum District is a set of ten towers office building and hotel on the Majlis Al Taawon street, West Bay Doha, Qatar. It was begun in 2012 and completed in 2016. The design, construction and comments of this collection have been under the supervision of AECOM.Qatar Petroleum District towers a five-star business hotel, restaurants, conference centre, mosque and other amenities.

References 

Doha
Skyscrapers in Doha
Skyscraper office buildings
Office buildings completed in 2016
Hotels in Qatar